Elwin Schlebrowski (31 August 1925 – 8 February 2000) was a German international footballer who played as a midfielder for Borussia Dortmund.

External links
 
 

1925 births
2000 deaths
German footballers
Germany international footballers
Association football midfielders
Borussia Dortmund players